Sureh or Sowreh may refer to:
 Sureh, Hormozgan
 Sureh, Khuzestan
 Sureh, Razavi Khorasan
 Sureh, Tehran
 Sureh, West Azerbaijan